Scutiger mammatus (common names: Tungsolo lazy toad, chest spiny cat-eyed toad, spiny-chest cat-eyed toad) is a species of frog in the family Megophryidae. It is endemic to Western China and known from eastern Tibet, southeastern Qinghai, western Sichuan, and northwestern Yunnan.

Description
Adult males measure  and adult females  in snout–vent length, although Jiang and colleagues report a much lower range for males, . The head is broad and depressed. The tympanum is small and hidden under skin. The toes are partially webbed. Males have nuptial spines on the first and second fingers, as well as two well-developed chest glands covered by strong spines. No vocal sac is present.

The tadpoles are adapted to running water and have elongated, dorso-ventrally flattened bodies and long tails.

Habitat and conservation
It is a very common species. Threats to it are unknown, but overgrazing is a potential threat. There are many protected areas within its range.

References

mammatus
Amphibians of China
Endemic fauna of China
Fauna of Tibet
Amphibians described in 1896
Taxa named by Albert Günther
Taxonomy articles created by Polbot